Stephen John Harris (16 August 1948 – 11 January 2008) was an English jazz drummer and composer.

Born in Mansfield in Nottinghamshire, he took up drums at the age of 14 and was soon playing in pop and soul bands. In the late 1960s he was a member of the progressive rock band Woody Kern who recorded on Pye Records.

From 1987 onwards, Harris was a member of the Nottingham-based band Pinski Zoo, who blended free jazz with funk.

In 2001 he formed the group Zaum, named after the Russian Futurist concept Zaum. Their 2004 recording Above Our Heads the Sky Splits Open  is highly regarded, achieving a 5-star rating in The Penguin Guide to Jazz. Zaum's final recording before his death was the octet record "I hope you never love anything as much as I love you".

Harris died on 11 January 2008 in Dorchester, Dorset.

References

1948 births
2008 deaths
English jazz drummers
British male drummers
British male jazz musicians
20th-century British male musicians